Vincent Delpuech (5 April 1888 – 9 March 1966) was a French journalist and politician.

Early life
Vincent Delpuech was born on 5 April 1888 in Port-de-Bouc, a village in Provence, Southern France. He was educated in Marseille.

During World War I, he served in the Troupes coloniales.

Career
Delpuech started his career as a parliamentary assistant for Frédéric Chevillon. After the latter was killed in the war, Delpuech worked as a parliamentary assistant to Benoît Bergeon.

He served as a member of the French Senate from 1938 to 1945. He was re-elected in 1955, up until 1966.

Death
He died on 9 March 1966 in Marseille.

Legacy
The Boulevard Vincent Delpuech in Marseille was named after him.

References

1888 births
1960 deaths
People from Bouches-du-Rhône
Writers from Marseille
French military personnel of World War I
French Senators of the Third Republic
French Senators of the Fourth Republic
Senators of Bouches-du-Rhône
20th-century French journalists
Politicians from Marseille